Dario Bond (born 18 May 1961) is an Italian politician from Veneto.

He was first elected to the Regional Council of Veneto in 2005 for Forza Italia. Re-elected in 2010, he was floor leader of The People of Freedom from 2010 to 2015.

References

People from Feltre
Forza Italia politicians
The People of Freedom politicians
21st-century Italian politicians
1961 births
Living people
Members of the Regional Council of Veneto